is a song by Japanese rock band Asian Kung-Fu Generation. It was released on July 25, 2012 and reached number 11 on the Oricon charts. It was used as the theme song for Road to Ninja: Naruto the Movie and one of the 3 songs by Asian Kung-Fu Generation used in Naruto media, alongside Haruka Kanata, and Blood Circulator. The song was ranked 9th on fans request for the band's 10th anniversary live setlist on September 14, 2013.

Music video
The music video features all activities in loop. Band members appear in different scenes; Gotoh rotate from left to right while singing, Kita playing guitar next to boy who throw baseball in repeat, Yamada playing bass in a room, and Ijichi playing drum with balls falling behind him.

Track listing

Personnel
Masafumi Gotō – lead vocals, rhythm guitar
Kensuke Kita – lead guitar, background vocals
Takahiro Yamada –  bass, background vocals
Kiyoshi Ijichi – drums
Asian Kung-Fu Generation – producer

Charts

References 

2012 singles
2012 songs
Asian Kung-Fu Generation songs
Ki/oon Music singles
Japanese film songs
Naruto songs
Songs written for animated films
Songs written by Masafumi Gotoh
Songs written by Takahiro Yamada (musician)